Mac OS Romanian is a character encoding used on Apple Macintosh computers to represent the Romanian language. It is a derivative of Mac OS Roman.

IBM uses code page 1285 (CCSID 1285) for Mac OS Romanian.

Character set 
Each character is shown with its equivalent Unicode code point. Only the second half of the table (code points 128–255) is shown, the first half (code points 0–127) being the same as ASCII.

References 

Character sets
Romanian